Philibert, Count de Gramont (1621 – 31 January 1707), was a French courtier and soldier, known as the protagonist of the Mémoires written by Anthony Hamilton (his brother-in-law). He was a younger half-brother of Antoine III of Gramont and uncle of Catherine Charlotte de Gramont, princess of Monaco.

Birth and origins 
Philibert was born in 1621, probably at the Château de Bidache, the second son of Antoine II de Gramont and his second wife, Claude de Montmorency-Bouteville. His father was the head of the illustrious Gramont family and ruler of the Principality of Bidache. At the time of Philibert's birth he was comte de Guiche but later became duc de Gramont de Guiche. His first wife had been Louise de Roquelaure. Philibert's mother was his father's second wife. The Montmorency-Bouteville family was a cadet branch of the illustrious House of Montmorency.

Philibert's paternal grandmother, Diane d'Andouins, comtesse de Gramont, was "la belle Corisande," one of the mistresses of Henry IV. The grandson assumed that his father, Antoine II de Gramont, viceroy of Navarre, was the son of Henry IV, and regretted that his father had not claimed the privileges of royal paternity.

{{Tree chart| | | |PhlGr|y|Diane|boxstyle=border-width: 1px; border-radius: 0.5em;
  |PhlGr=Philibertcomte deGramont|boxstyle_PhlGr=border-width: 1px; border-radius: 0.5em; background: lavender;
  |Diane=[[Diane d'Andouins|Dianed'Andouins]]}}

His parents had married in 1618.

 Early life 
Philibert was destined for the church, and was educated at the college of Pau, in Béarn. He refused the ecclesiastical life, however, and joined the army of Prince Thomas of Savoy, then in 1643 besieging Trino in Piedmont. He afterwards served under his elder half-brother, Antoine, marshal de Gramont, and the prince de Condé. He was present at the battles of Freiburg and Nördlingen, and served with distinction in Spain and Flanders in 1647. In 1654 he fought at Arras where Turenne relieved the town besieged by the Spanish.

He favoured Condé's party at the beginning of the Fronde, but changed sides before he was too severely compromised. In spite of his record in the army, he never received any important commission either military or diplomatic, perhaps because of an incurable levity in his outlook. He was, however, made governor of the Pays d'Aunis and lieutenant of Béarn. He visited England during the Commonwealth.

 Exile and marriage 
In 1662 he was exiled from France for courting Anne-Lucie de la Mothe-Houdancourt, one of the king's mistresses. He went to England where he found at the court of Charles II an atmosphere congenial to his talents for intrigue, gallantry and pleasure. He arrived in London in January 1663.

Philibert quickly entered into the English court's inner circle. Not much adaptation was needed as French was the predominant language at the Restoration court. Elizabeth Hamilton, the sister of Anthony Hamilton, admired his wit and gallantry and fell in love with him.

Philibert married her in London in December 1663 or early in 1664. In March 1664, having heard of his marriage, Louis XIV wrote him a letter saying that he could come back. The couple had a son on 28 August old style, but he died as an infant.

There is a famous anecdote told about her marriage, which reverts the order of events by placing the marriage, which was, according to this tale, forced on de Gramont by her brothers, after the permission to return. It goes as follows:

When in 1664 he was allowed to return to France, he left in haste, giving the impression that he would not honour his commitments. Her brothers George and Anthony therefore pursued and intercepted him on his way to Dover and pressured him to return and marry her. They asked him whether he had not forgotten something in London. He replied "Pardonnez-moi, messieurs, j'ai oublié d'épouser votre sœur." (Forgive me, Sirs, I have forgotten to marry your sister). He turned around, went back to London, and dutifully married her.

The story is partly proven wrong since he married her before Louis allowed him to come back, but it could well be true that a bit of pressure from her brothers was needed. It has been said that this incident suggested to Molière his comedy Le mariage forcé, first presented 29 January 1664, but this idea clashes with the known dates.

 Back in France 
In 1664 he was allowed to return to France. He revisited England in 1670 in connection with the Sale of Dunkirk, and again in 1671 and 1676. In 1688 he was sent by Louis XIV to congratulate James II on the birth of an heir. From all these small diplomatic missions he succeeded in obtaining considerable profits, being destitute, and having no scruples whenever money was in question. At the age of 75 he fell dangerously ill, which caused him to become reconciled to the church. His penitence does not seem to have survived his recovery.

In June 1673, he fought at the Siege of Maastricht during which Louis XIV took the town from the Dutch.

In 1679, his elder brother Henri died unmarried and Philibert therefore became comte de Toulongeon. He did not want to change his name to Toulongeon, but changed it from chevalier de Gramont to comte de Gramont, and his wife became comtesse. Henri had appointed him his heir and he inherited his brother's château at Séméac.

On 31 December 1688 he was made a knight of the Order of the Holy Spirit in a ceremony performed in the Chapel of the Château de Versailles. This gave him the right to wear the blue sash called the cordon bleu that hangs over his right shoulder on his portrait.

 
 Children 
His wife gave him two children, daughters both:
Claude Charlotte (c. 1665 – 1739), who married Henry Stafford-Howard, 1st Earl of Stafford

Both were maids-of-honour to Maria Anna Victoria of Bavaria, whom the Grand Dauphin married in 1680. Saint-Simon comments that they did not have much success at the court.

He also had a bastard daughter, born in Piedmont, at the siege of Trino: Giacomo or Jacques, daughter of Countess Theresia de' Medici, granddaughter of don Antonio de' Medici via his son Antonfrancesco.

 Memoirs 

He was 80 years old when he supplied his brother-in-law, Anthony Hamilton, with the material for his Mémoires. Hamilton said that they had been dictated to him, but no doubt he was the real author. The account of Gramont's early career was doubtless provided by himself, but Hamilton was probably more familiar with the history of the court of Charles II, which forms the most interesting part of the book. Moreover, Gramont, though he had a reputation for wit, was no writer, and there is no reason to suppose that he was capable of producing a work that remains a masterpiece of style and of witty portraiture.

His biographer Hamilton was far superior as a writer to the comte de Gramont, but he relates the story of his hero without comment, and no condemnation of the prevalent code of morals is allowed to appear, unless by an occasional touch of irony. The portrait is drawn with such skill that the count, despite his biographer's candour, imposes by his grand air on the reader much as he appears to have done on his contemporaries. The book is the most entertaining of contemporary memoirs, and in no other book is there a description so vivid, truthful, and graceful of the licentious court of Charles II. There are other and less flattering accounts of the count. His scandalous tongue knew no restraint, and he was a privileged person who was allowed to state even the most unpleasing truths to Louis XIV.

When the Mémoires were finished, it is said that Gramont sold the manuscript for 1500 francs; and kept most of the money for himself. Fontenelle, then censor of the press, refused to license the book from considerations of respect to the strange old man, whose gambling, cheating and meanness were so ruthlessly exposed. But Gramont himself appealed to the chancellor and the prohibition was lifted.

 Death and timeline 
Gramont died on 10 January 1707 in Paris, and the Mémoires appeared six years later.

 Notes and references 
 Notes 

 Citations 

 Sources 

 
  – Knights of the Order of the Holy Spirit and general index
 
 
 
 
  – 1684 to 1686
  – 1706 to 1707
 
  – (for timeline)
  – Princeps
  – Commentary by Cyril Hughes Hartmann on Hamilton's Memoirs in Quennell's translation
 
  – GAR to GUE (for Gramont)
 
 

  – Abercorn to Balmerino
  
  – 1706 to 1707
  – 1708
 Attribution:'''

1621 births
1707 deaths
18th-century memoirists
Counts of Gramont
French male non-fiction writers
French memoirists
Younger sons of dukes